Pumpkin is a 2002 romantic comedy film starring Christina Ricci. It is a story of forbidden love between a developmentally-disabled young man and a sorority girl. The film was directed by Anthony Abrams and Adam Larson Broder and written by Broder.

Plot
Carolyn McDuffy is a college senior beginning her last year of studies at a Southern California university. To help her sorority win a coveted award that has eluded them in the past years, she joins them in training some handicapped young adults for the Challenged Games (a fictional version of the Special Olympics).

Carolyn is paired with Jesse "Pumpkin" Romanoff, and is horrified as she has never been around challenged people. He is kind towards her and soon she finds herself developing affection towards him as he is genuine, unlike her boyfriend Kent Woodlands, and her sorority sisters, as led by Julie Thurber.

Carolyn experiences backlash and disdain about the relationship from her friends and family, including Pumpkin's own mother, Judy, despite the fact that her love has inspired him to get out of his wheelchair and become the best athlete on the team. Judy later walks into her son's room, discovering that Carolyn and Pumpkin have been sexually involved.

Pumpkin's mother accuses Carolyn of raping her son, saying she "has no idea what she has done" to him. Then she calls Carolyn's college, causing her to be kicked out of both her sorority and expelled from the university. Carolyn makes a suicide attempt by taking most of the pills and solutions from her medicine cabinet, but vomits them up.

Hearing of Carolyn's suicide attempt, the sorority convinces the university to allow her back in, and she is encouraged to attend the sorority ball with Kent; Julie feels their attendance will help the sorority secure their award. At the ball, Pumpkin and his friends crash the party to allow Pumpkin a dance with Carolyn. Kent confronts Pumpkin, punching him repeatedly, who responds by tackling Kent to the ground, temporarily knocking him unconscious.

Humiliated, Kent leaves the dance. When Carolyn tries to take Pumpkin inside to the dance, Julie and her sorority sisters block the door. She pushes her way through with Pumpkin and they dance alone. Soon, other attendees are impelled to join them on the dance floor.

Kent leaves the dance in his car, sobbing and driving erratically. He swerves to avoid a truck and plunges off a cliff with the car exploding in mid-air, crashing to the bottom. Carolyn goes to the hospital to check on Kent and finds that he is now paraplegic, though not burned from the explosion.

Kent blames Carolyn for his problems and she is left distraught. She drops out of college, swearing off Pumpkin forever. The sorority stops helping the team and their rival sorority wins the award. Carolyn enrolls at a public university, opening up to her encouraging peers.

The sorority sisters have a change of heart and show up at the Olympic event. Kent is now the coach for Pumpkin's team, becoming both a motivator and humble. Pumpkin races his rival, a bully who berates him at every chance. Pumpkin is motivated by Kent, telling him to win it for Carolyn, saying she wouldn't want him to lose. As he is running, seeing her in the stands gives him a sudden burst of energy.

Pumpkin wins the race, and at the finish line is congratulated by the sorority sisters, his mother, and Kent. Carolyn comes down to see him as his mother is hugging him. She endears him to Carolyn, finally accepting her son's progress into a man.

As Carolyn and Pumpkin walk off together, she asks him what name she should call him, and he replies that "Pumpkin will be fine." She then asks what he meant when he asked her early on in the film about the moon, wondering if the question was literal or metaphorical, to which he replies, "What?" Carolyn glances back with an ambiguous expression before continuing ahead.

Cast

Reception

Critical response
Pumpkin received mixed reviews from critics. On Rotten Tomatoes the movie so far has a score of 36% and an average rating of 4.9/10. On Metacritic the film has a score of 46 out of 100 based on reviews from 24 critics.

One of the most positive reviews was by Roger Ebert for the Chicago Sun-Times; he wrote, "Pumpkin is alive, and takes chances, and uses the wicked blade of satire in order to show up the complacent political correctness of other movies in its campus genre." Michael O'Sullivan of The Washington Post also approved of the film, calling it "an odd and oddly endearing romantic black comedy." On the other end of the spectrum, Todd McCarthy of Variety wrote that the film "gets along on curiosity value for a while, but becomes increasingly unconvincing and ludicrous as it staggers endlessly toward the finish line."

Box office and DVD
Pumpkin opened in American theatres on June 28, 2002, in a limited release. It grossed $30,514 in eight theatres in its first weekend, with a per-screen-average of $3,814. The film expanded to 19 theatres the following weekend, but its theatre count declined from there. Pumpkin completed its theatrical run four months later with a final gross of $308,552.

Since its DVD release, the film has become a cult hit. Ricci herself has called it "a great movie" and Jeff Weiss of Stylus magazine called it "one of the most underrated films of the decade."

References

External links
 
 
 
 
 
 Roger Ebert's review of Pumpkin

2002 films
2002 independent films
2002 romantic comedy-drama films
American independent films
American romantic comedy-drama films
American Zoetrope films
United Artists films
Films scored by John Ottman
Films about disability
Films about fraternities and sororities
Films produced by Andrea Sperling
Films set in Los Angeles
Films set in universities and colleges
Films shot in Los Angeles
2002 comedy films
2002 drama films
2000s English-language films
2000s American films